Dr Egerton Leigh,  (1702 - 5 February 1760) was an 18th-century Anglican clergyman and landowner in North West England.

He was Archdeacon of Salop from 1741 until 1760. His family were landed gentry owning states in Cheshire, being principally seated at West Hall, High Legh.

Family

Background
A scion of the ancient Cheshire gentry family of Leigh, one junior branch of which were the Leighs of Stoneleigh, he was the eldest son of the Revd Peter Leigh by his wife Elizabeth, only daughter of the Hon. Thomas Egerton (son of John Egerton, 2nd Earl of Bridgewater).

Leigh inherited the ancestral seat of West Hall together with the lordship of the manor of High Legh and the advowson of the 1st mediety of Lymm, as well as various other family estates in Cheshire.

Life
Educated at St John's College, Cambridge (LLB 1728, LLD 1743), Leigh served variously as Rector of Lymm; Rector of Myddle, Shropshire; Archdeacon of Salop; Prebendary of Bullinghope alias Bullingham Magna, Herefordshire; Canon of Hereford; Master of St Katherine's Hospital, Ledbury; and Vicar of Upton Bishop, Herefordshire.

A noted Cheshire antiquary, Leigh was a friend of the poet John Byrom.

Legacy
Dr Leigh married three times (1. Anne Yate; 2. Elizabeth Drinkwater; 3. Cassandra Phelips) and died in 1760 having had nineteen children, including, by the latter, George Leigh (bookseller and partner of John Sotheby); Sir Egerton Leigh, 1st Bt (Attorney-General of South Carolina) was a nephew and the suffragette Lydia Becker was a great-great-great niece.

His numerous descendants include Sir Neville Leigh KCVO and his son Sir Edward Leigh  MP, the Leycester-Roxby family, the Booths of Foxley, Lymm, the Earls of Bantry, the Cunliffe and Edwards baronets and the TV personality Al Murray.

Lichfield Cathedral contains various memorial tablets to the Leigh family.

See also 
 High Legh
 Burke's Landed Gentry

References 

1702 births
1760 deaths
People from Cheshire
English gentry families
People educated at Eton College
Alumni of St John's College, Cambridge
Fellows of St John's College, Cambridge
Fellows of the Society of Antiquaries of London
18th-century English Anglican priests
Archdeacons of Shropshire